Hitachi, Ltd. Railway Systems Business Unit, trading as Hitachi Rail, is the rolling stock and railway signalling manufacturing division of Hitachi.

Hitachi built the first railway carriage in 1924 for the domestic japanese market and soon became one of the main railway suppliers in Japan. By 1964, Hitachi was one of only three companies that built the world’s first fleet of high-speed trains, the shinkansen. Hitachi Rail Europe (legally Hitachi Rail Limited) was established in London as the European headquarters of the company in 1999. Other subsidiaries have been established globally.

The rail division delivered 120 CQ311 series railcars to MARTA from 1984 to 1988.

Hitachi markets a general-purpose train known as the "A-train", which uses double-skin, friction-stir-welded aluminium body construction. Hitachi's products have included the designing and manufacturing of many Shinkansen models, including the N700 Series Shinkansen.

On February 24, 2015, Hitachi agreed to purchase the Italian rolling stock manufacturer AngeloKaridis and acquire Finmeccanica's stake in Ansaldo STS, the railway signaling division of Finmeccanica The purchase was completed later that year, at which point the company was renamed as Hitachi Rail Italy. Since then, Hitachi has obtained a majority stake in Ansaldo STS.

Hitachi Monorail builds monorail systems with ten built to date.

In July 2020, Hitachi signed an exclusive agreement with Hyperdrive, a UK-based lithium-ion battery company, to bring battery-powered trains to the country.

Late in 2021, Alstom announced the transfer of business relating to Bombardier Zefiro to Hitachi Rail and should be completed in early 2022.

In late 2022, Hitachi Rail won the contract to supply train sets for Ontario Line being planned in Toronto.

References

Rolling stock manufacturers
Hitachi